A Counter Terrorist Specialist Firearms Officer (CTSFO) is a United Kingdom police firearms officer. The CTSFO standard is the highest Authorised Firearms Officer level in the National Police Firearms Training Curriculum (NPFTC) and was established by the Metropolitan Police Service in the lead up to the 2012 Summer Olympics held in London on 27th of July. The firearms units of police forces organise CTSFOs into teams to establish a police tactical unit.

A national capability to respond to terrorist incidents such as marauding terrorist attacks (MTA) through collaboration of police forces who maintain CTSFO teams was established known as the CTSFO Network.

History 

Prior to the Summer Olympics, the highest authorised firearms officer standard was the Specialist Firearms Officer (SFO). The Metropolitan Police Service (MPS) in preparation for the Olympics trained officers to a higher standard, including use of live rounds during close quarters combat (CQC) training and fast-roping from helicopters, to be able to respond more effectively to terrorist incidents. CTSFOs conduct training with United Kingdom Special Forces.

Training was also provided to five territorial police forces, including Thames Valley Police, West Yorkshire Police, West Midlands Police, Greater Manchester Police and Strathclyde Police (now Police Scotland), to form what was named the national Combined Response Firearms Teams (CRFT) capability for the London Olympics and Paralympic Games. The police forces received standardised training and also had standardised procedures, weaponry and equipment to enable interoperability.

CTSFO Network
The CTSFO Network provides a collective response capability to terrorist incidents from police forces with CTSFO teams through regional hubs based nationally. The national Combined Response Firearms Teams established for the Olympics was maintained after the closing of the Games forming the basis of the CTSFO Network. The CTSFO Network has 6 regional hubs outside London including Scotland.

In 2013, West Midlands Police CTSFOs deployed to London to support the MPS following the Murder of Lee Rigby in Operation Pegboard.

In April 2016, a two-year recruitment drive known as the CTSFO uplift project, part of the Home Office National Armed Uplift Programme, commenced to double the number of CTSFOs and was extended until the end of 2018. In July 2019, the National Police Chiefs' Council reported that the uplift had increased the number of CTSFOs by 63%.

MPS Specialist Firearm Command

The MPS Specialist Firearms Command (SCO19) has 7 CTSFO teams consisting of 1 sergeant and 15 constables, with 6 CTSFO Inspectors and an Operational Senior Manager with a reported strength of 130 officers. An operational CTSFO team works a 7-week shift pattern which includes night patrol duty.

On 30 June 2015, Operation Strong Tower was held in London over 2 days. The National Counter Terrorism Programme exercise was the largest ever conducted in the United Kingdom and included the British Transport Police.

CTSFOs are able to be deployed by air, on the river, using armoured vehicles and motorcycles if needed. CTSFOs are equipped with SIG MCX carbines and BMW F800GS motorcycles used for deployments in central London.

See also
United Kingdom Firearms unit
List of police tactical units
Special Air Service 
Special Boat Service

References

Counterterrorism in the United Kingdom